Choi Kyung-Ju (born 19 May 1970), commonly known as K. J. Choi, is a South Korean professional golfer who currently plays on the PGA Tour and PGA Tour Champions. Since turning pro in 1994, he has won more than twenty professional golf tournaments worldwide, including eight on the PGA Tour, making him Asia's most successful male golfer. His most notable victory came at the 2011 Players Championship, and he has spent 40 weeks in the top-10 of the world rankings.

Professional career
Choi turned professional in 1994 after fulfilling his military obligation.

After establishing his career on the Korean Tour, where he picked up his first professional win in 1995, and the Japan Golf Tour, where he won twice in 1999, Choi qualified for membership of the U.S.-based PGA Tour by finishing tied 35th at the 1999 qualifying tournament. He was the first Korean to earn a PGA Tour card. In his rookie season in 2000 he finished 134th on the money list and had to requalify, but since 2001 he has been a consistent performer on the tour. In 2002 he became the first Korean to win on the PGA Tour at the Compaq Classic of New Orleans, and followed it up with another victory at the Tampa Bay Classic later that year.

In 2003 he won the Linde German Masters on the European Tour, his first and only win to date on the European Tour.

Choi won Jack Nicklaus's Memorial Tournament in 2007. He mentioned on CBS during the AT&T National that he read Jack Nicklaus's "Golf My Way" book early in his golf career, which assisted him in becoming the golfer he is today.

Choi won the first AT&T National hosted by Tiger Woods at the Congressional Country Club in Bethesda, Maryland. The trophy is a small replica of the U.S. Capitol building in Washington, DC. He made a spectacular sand trap shot on the 17th hole for a birdie to clinch the win over Steve Stricker by 3 shots. Choi was a crowd favorite and threw his golf ball into the crowd after holing his sand shot on the 17th hole.

In August 2007 he reached the top 10 of the world rankings for the first time. In January 2008, Choi won the Sony Open in Hawaii and rose to world number 7. In March 2008, Choi reached fifth place in the rankings.

After his 7th PGA Tour victory at the 2008 Sony Open in Hawaii, Choi donated $320,000 of his earnings to the victims' families of a warehouse fire in Seoul, South Korea, which killed over forty people.

Choi won his fourth title on the Asian Tour in Malaysia in 2009 at the Iskandar Johor Open, which was reduced to 3 rounds due to inclement weather.

In May 2011, Choi won The Players Championship at TPC Sawgrass in a playoff against David Toms. Choi had a one shot lead going down the 18th hole in regulation time, but Toms made birdie while Choi could only chip and putt for a par taking it to a sudden-death playoff. Both players found the green at the first extra hole, the 17th, and then missed with their attempted birdie efforts. Toms however also missed the return four footer for par leaving Choi with a three-foot par putt to seal victory. This to date is the South Korean's biggest PGA Tour victory. Following his win, Choi donated $200,000 to help victims of the tornadoes that ravaged the southeastern United States in April.

In February 2016, Choi finished runner-up at the Farmers Insurance Open to Brandt Snedeker, during a Monday finish to the weather disrupted event. This was notable because it was the first time in Choi's PGA Tour career that he did not convert a 54-hole lead or co-lead into a win. He was previously 5 for 5 in converted 54 holes leads to victories. The result moved Choi up 197 places in the world rankings from 334th to 137th. Choi continued his good early season from at the Northern Trust Open where he finished in a tie for fifth, despite holding the co-lead during the final round. This moved Choi to just outside the top 100 at 102nd in the rankings.

In May 2020, Choi turned 50 years of age and qualified for the PGA Tour Champions. In September 2021, Choi won his first tournament on that tour, the PURE Insurance Championship at Pebble Beach Golf Links in Pebble Beach, California.

In November 2022, Choi visited Vietnam to co-design Amber Hills Golf & Resort, Rock Valley Course with golf architect Paul Albanese in Bac Giang province near Hanoi

Team golf career
Choi represented South Korea in the WGC-World Cup in 2002, 2003, and 2005, and was a member of the International Team in the Presidents Cup in 2003, 2007, and 2011.

Personal life
Choi was born in Wando, South Korea. He currently resides in Southlake, Texas, near fellow South Korean PGA Tour player Yang Yong-eun. He is a devout Christian and member of the Korean United Methodist Church. He has donated much of his money to charity through the K.J. Choi Foundation.

Before picking up golf Choi was a competitive power lifter, being able to squat  as a  13-year-old, thus aptly nicknamed "Tank" by South Koreans.

Choi played the role of professional golfer T.K. Oh in the movie Seven Days in Utopia.

Professional wins (30)

PGA Tour wins (8)

PGA Tour playoff record (1–0)

European Tour wins (1)

Japan Golf Tour wins (2)

*Note: The 1999 Kirin Open was shortened to 54 holes due to rain.
1Co-sanctioned by the Asia Golf Circuit

Japan Golf Tour playoff record (1–0)

Asian Tour wins (6)

*Note: Tournament shortened to 54 holes due to weather.
1Co-sanctioned by the Korean Tour

Asian Tour playoff record (1–0)

Korean Tour wins (16)

*Note: The 2005 SK Telecom Open was shortened to 54 holes due to weather.
1Co-sanctioned by the Asian Tour

Other wins (1)

PGA Tour Champions wins (1)

PGA Tour Champions playoff record (0–1)

Results in major championships

CUT = missed the half-way cut
"T" = tied

Summary

Most consecutive cuts made – 10 (2003 Open Championship – 2005 PGA)
Longest streak of top-10s – 1 (six times)

The Players Championship

Wins (1)

Results timeline

CUT = missed the halfway cut
"T" indicates a tie for a place.

Results in World Golf Championships

QF, R16, R32, R64 = Round in which player lost in match play
"T" = Tied
Note that the HSBC Champions did not become a WGC event until 2009.

Results in senior major championships

"T" indicates a tie for a place

Team appearances
Professional
World Cup (representing South Korea): 1997, 2002, 2003, 2005, 2013
Presidents Cup (International Team): 2003 (tie), 2007, 2011

See also
1999 PGA Tour Qualifying School graduates
2000 PGA Tour Qualifying School graduates
List of golfers with most Asian Tour wins

References

External links

South Korean male golfers
Asian Tour golfers
Japan Golf Tour golfers
PGA Tour golfers
South Korean expatriate sportspeople in the United States
South Korean United Methodists
Sportspeople from South Jeolla Province
1970 births
Living people